Paul Abramson (5 October 1889 Pala Parish (now Peipsiääre Parish), Kreis Dorpat – 20 January 1976) was an Estonian politician. He was a member of I Riigikogu. He was a member of the assembly since 25 January 1921. He replaced Otto Münther. On 26 October 1921, he was removed from his position and he was replaced by Johann Anderson.

References

1889 births
1976 deaths
People from Peipsiääre Parish
People from Kreis Dorpat
Estonian Independent Socialist Workers' Party politicians
Estonian Workers' Party politicians
Members of the Riigikogu, 1920–1923
Members of the Riigikogu, 1926–1929
estonian military personnel of the Estonian War of Independence